Adabi Consumer Industries Sdn. Bhd. (known as Adabi; stylized in the logo as adabi) is a Malaysian food manufacturing company. Established in 1984 by Dato’ Syed Manshor Syed Mahmood, the company specializing in manufacturing food products including sauces and spices. Its headquarters is located at Rawang, Selangor, Malaysia. Known for its philosophy, "Sajian Istana di Zaman Silam" (Palace Dishes in the Past), the official slogan of the company is Bersih dan Asli.

History and products
Adabi was founded by Dato’ Syed Manshor Syed Mahmood in March 1984. The company has produced more than 80 products with various food categories under the company’s corporate name.

Television
 Jaguh Kampung (Astro Prima)
 Spice Routes (TV3)

References

External links
 

1984 establishments in Malaysia
Food and drink companies established in 1984
Food and drink companies of Malaysia
Malaysian brands
Malaysian companies established in 1984
Privately held companies of Malaysia